Courtney Elizabeth Jines (born May 4, 1992) is an American actress, producer, and screenwriter. She is best known for her roles as Demetra in Spy Kids 3-D: Game Over and Amanda Wilkinson in Because of Winn-Dixie. In 2012 Courtney founded her own production company called Moonflower Pictures.

Life and career
Jines was born in Fairfax, Virginia. She began acting professionally at the age of 8. Her first television appearance was in 2000 in the episode "Demolition Derby" of the television series Third Watch as Lisa Hagonon. Her first role in film was as Harriet Deal in Drop Back Ten in 2000. She played Hannah Miller in the Law & Order: Special Victims Unit episode "Pixies" and Delilah in Gaudi Afternoon in 2001, and Jessica Trent in a CSI: Crime Scene Investigation episode called "Cats in the Cradle" in 2002. Also in 2002, she played Julie Morgan in Anna's Dream. In 2003 she played Kristen Farrell in the television series That Was Then, and Rachel in the ER episode "A Saint in the City." She was in Red Betsy as Jane Rounds, and played Demetra (A.K.A. The Deceiver) in Spy Kids 3-D: Game Over, which is the role that Jines is most famous for. In 2004, she guest starred on Jack & Bobby as Deena Greenberg in the episode "Today I Am a Man." In 2005, she starred as Bridget Byrne in Silver Bells. Jines also had the recurring role of Heidi on The War at Home.

In 2015, Courtney won a fellowship with Sundance Institute's Ignite Program, making her one of two female directors selected.

Filmography

Television

Film

References

External links 

1992 births
21st-century American actresses
Actresses from Virginia
American child actresses
American film actresses
American television actresses
Living people
Actors from Fairfax, Virginia